Nikita Rafailovich Kokuyev (or Kokujev; ; 28 October 1848, Maloarkhangelsk - 31 March 1914) was a Russian entomologist.

He specialized in Hymenoptera and Coleoptera and described new taxa in both groups. His collection is in the
Zoological Museum of the Zoological Institute of the Russian Academy of Sciences

Works
Partial list:
Hymenoptera asiatica nova. Russkoe Entomologicheskoye Obozreniye. 3:285-288. (1903)
Hymenoptera asiatica nova VI. Russkoe Entomologicheskoye Obozreniye. 5:10-15.(1905)
Hymenoptera asiatica nova VII. Russkoe Entomologicheskoye Obozreniye. 5:208-210. (1905)
Ichneumonidae (Hymenoptera) a clarissimis V.J. Roborovski et P.K. Kozlov annis 1894-1895 et 1900-1901 in China, Mongolia et Tibetia lecti. Ezhegodnik Zoologicheskago Muzeya. Annales du Musée Zoologique. Académie Impériale des Sciences. Saint-Pétersbourg 14:12-47. (1909)
Duo Hemiptera [recte: Hymenoptera] nova faunae turanicae a J.V. Vasiljev collecta. Russkoe Entomologicheskoye Obozreniye. 12:407-408. (1912)
Contribution à la faune des Hyménoptères de la Russie III. Revue Russe d'Entomologie. 13:161-170. (1913)
Hymenoptera recueillies par V. Sovinskij sur les bords du lac Bajkal en 1902.(in Russian with Latin descriptions) Travaux de la Commission pour l'étude du lac Bajkal. 2:63-76. (1927)

References
Pesenko, Yu. A. & Astafurova, Yu. V. 2003: Annotated Bibliography of Russian and Soviet Publications on the Bees 1771 - 2002 (Hymenoptera: Apoidea; excluding Apis mellifera). Denisia 11 1-616

External links
ZinRus List of types of Braconidae

Russian entomologists
Hymenopterists
1848 births
1914 deaths
Biologists from the Russian Empire